Local government elections took place in London, and some other parts of the United Kingdom on Thursday 5 May 1994. Ward changes took place in Barking and Dagenham and Ealing which increased the total number of councillors by 3 from 1,914 to 1,917.

All London borough council seats were up for election.  The previous Borough elections in London were in 1990.

The Labour Party under John Smith achieved its best result since 1974, gaining 119 councillors and control of 3 councils. The Conservatives saw heavy losses, losing 212 councillors and 8 councils; the Conservative collapse also benefited the Liberal Democrats, who recovered from their 1990 low point and gained 94 councillors.

Results summary

Turnout: 2,240,639 voters cast ballots, a turnout of 46.1% (-2.1%).

Council results

Borough result maps

References

 
May 1994 events in the United Kingdom
1994